"Writing to Reach You" is the first single taken from Scottish rock band Travis' second studio album, The Man Who (1999).

Background
The song was written by Fran Healy, who admitted that he had written this song while listening to "'74–'75" on the radio and took the guitar chords from Oasis' "Wonderwall" and "D'You Know What I Mean?"; as overts acknowledgement of this, the song contains the lyric "and what's a wonderwall, anyway?". In 2004, both "Writing to Reach You" and "Wonderwall" were mixed with Green Day's "Boulevard of Broken Dreams" in the popular mashup "Boulevard of Broken Songs". The single was the group's first release in Japan and Australia, following their success in the United Kingdom. The song also earned Travis their first appearance on Top of the Pops. The single peaked at number 14 on the UK Singles Chart. Fran was reading Letters to Felice from Franz Kafka while he wrote this song.

Music video
The video was directed by John Hardwick. It features Healy walking in the countryside and being attacked by a pair of innocent looking schoolchildren. They pelt him with stones and shoot him with arrows, only to find that he is wearing body armour, which he takes off with the arrows still embedded. He is also attacked by a Bf109 fighter plane being flown by one of the children. The video ends with Healy giving a letter of some sort to the school girl that shot him with arrows earlier and she runs toward the camera as it travels further away from the set.

Track listings

 UK CD single 1 and digital download 1
 "Writing to Reach You" — 3:44
 "Green Behind the Ears" — 3:40
 "Only Molly Knows" — 3:21

 UK CD single 2 and digital download 2
 "Writing to Reach You" — 3:42
 "Yeah Yeah Yeah Yeah" — 3:49
 "High as a Kite" — 2:30

 UK cassette and 7-inch single
" Writing to Reach You" — 3:41
 "Only Molly Knows" — 3:20

 Australian CD single
 "Writing to Reach You" — 3:42
 "Green Behind the Ears" — 3:40
 "Only Molly Knows" — 3:19
 "Yeah Yeah Yeah Yeah" — 3:49
 "High as a Kite" — 2:30

 Japanese CD single
 "Writing to Reach You" — 3:42
 "Yeah Yeah Yeah Yeah" — 3:49
 "High as a Kite" — 2:30
 "Green Behind the Ears" — 3:40
 "Only Molly Knows" — 3:19

Appearances in popular culture
The song's intro is used as bumper music on the Ring of Fire radio program.

Charts

References

Travis (band) songs
1999 singles
1999 songs
Independiente (record label) singles
Song recordings produced by Nigel Godrich
Songs written by Fran Healy (musician)